Azadi Square (  literally means "Freedom Square" or "Liberty Square"), formerly known as Shahyad Square (Persian: میدان شهیاد Meydāne Ŝahyād literally means "Remembrance of [the] Shah Square"), is a mainly green city square in Tehran, Iran. It hosts as its centerpiece the Azadi Tower. The tower and square were commissioned by Mohammad Reza Pahlavi, the last Shah of Iran, to mark the 2,500th year of the foundation of the Imperial State of Iran.

Design and Architecture 
It has an area of about 50,000 m2, plus adjacent areas and has a very large roundabout within its main confines. It is the largest square in Tehran and the second largest in Iran, being smaller than Azerbaijan Square in Tabriz.

Located in the center of the Azadi Square is the Azadi Tower which has height  45 m. The design of the tower and the surrounding area is an archetype of Iranian-Islamic architecture and aesthetic geometry. The fountain is inspired by Iranian gardens, and the slope of the square was carefully and purposefully designed, assisting with efficient irrigation. This status is reflected in the green and bold choice of name, meydāne as in Turkish being loosely cognate with medina, in some Arabic senses meaning garden square, otherwise secluded quarter.

According to Hossein Amanat: "The designs in the square that form the gardens and flower beds are inspired by the interior design of the dome of the Sheikh Lotfollah Mosque in Isfahan; However, the geometry of the dome has become oval. "There are interesting logarithmic relationships in the geometry and dimensions of the dome of Sheikh Lotfollah Mosque, which show the deep mathematical knowledge of Iranian architects in previous periods."

"The design of water fountains and fountains is also inspired by Iranian gardens. Also, the slope of the square is carefully designed for a specific purpose, the height of the Freedom Tower is 45 meters; Because it is located near Mehrabad airport and can not be built taller than this; But I wanted to go up when you approached the building, when it was not possible to raise the building. In order to solve the problem of height, we created a slope in the field; This means that when you enter the square from the airport, you approach the tower in a downhill manner and reach that circular fountain, and when you approach the building, you go up again. The ground under the tower is perfectly flat. "This smoothness and that slope of the field, when combined, create interesting arc lines."

Before the Iranian Revolution in 1979, it was called the Shahyad Square, meaning "Shah's Memorial Square", and was the site of many of the Revolution's demonstrations leading up to 12 December 1979. Annually many Iranians celebrate the revolution in Azadi Square. One of the famous concert halls of the capital is at the tower.

Roads
 From north:  Mohammad Ali Jenah Expressway
 From west:  Karaj Makhsus (Special) Road
 From southwest:  Mehrabad Airport entrance road
 From south:  Saidi Expressway
 From east:  Azadi Street

Public Transportation

 Tehran BRT Line 1, 2, 10
  Meydan-e Azadi Metro Station

See also
 List of city squares by size
 Azadi Tower

References

Iranian Revolution
National squares
Squares in Tehran